Arnold Carl Osland (born October 1942) is an American politician for the Republican Party who served as a member of the North Dakota Senate from the 20th District from 2017 until his resignation on March 18, 2019 due to health reasons.

References 

1942 births
Living people
Republican Party North Dakota state senators
21st-century American politicians